A Knox Box  is a small, wall-mounted safe that holds building keys for fire departments, emergency medical services, and sometimes police to retrieve in emergency situations. The term "Knox-Box" is a brand name for such products produced by the American company Knox Associates, which does business as The Knox Company. The Knox Box is part of a line of security-related products marketed as the Knox Rapid Access System.

Local fire departments hold master keys to all Knox Boxes in their response area, enabling them to quickly enter buildings in their area without having to force entry or find individual keys held in deposit at the station. Sometimes the Knox Master Key is stored in a key retention device such as Sentralok or KeySecure. Knox Master Key retention devices provide accountability on access to the key. KeySecure records an audit trail of when the key is accessed while Sentralok requires a dispatcher to release the key with DTMF tones. Both Sentralok and KeySecure are also branded products of the Knox Company.

A Knox Box can also cut fire losses for building owners since firefighters can enter buildings without breaking doors or windows. It can also reduce the potential of a firefighter being injured forcing entry.

The disadvantage of the system is that it provides a single point of failure for the security of many buildings. If the key to a district's Knox Box is stolen or copied, a thief can enter any building in the area that has a Knox Box. All Knox commercial boxes have a standard tamper switch which can be wired to the building's fire alarm control panel to sound a supervisory alert if the box is opened.

The keys for Knox KeySecure are the same throughout a district (the extent of which depends on the district). At the February 2013 RSA Conference, a researcher publicized a possible exploit, claiming that he had successfully ordered a box, disassembled it, and used the information from disassembling the lock cylinder to create his own master key.

See also 
 Real-estate lock box a device with a similar purpose used by real estate agents

References

External links
 Knox Company website

Firefighting equipment
Physical security
Security technology